FLIC may refer to:
 FLIC (file format), an extension for the FLIC animation file format
 Florida Legislative Investigation Committee, a government committee in Florida, US, which investigated allegedly subversive activity
 Fluorescence interference contrast microscopy, an optical technique for axial resolution in the nanometer regime

See also
 Flick (disambiguation) 
 Un Flic, 1972 French crime film